The 1915–16 Toronto Hockey Club season was the fourth season of the Toronto franchise in the National Hockey Association (NHA).

Off-season
The club was sold to Eddie Livingstone, owner of the Toronto Shamrocks, before the season. At the same time, the PCHA started a new franchise in Seattle and the new team signed several players from the Torontos: Eddie Carpenter, Frank Foyston (after one game), Hap Holmes, Jack Walker and Cully Wilson. Livingstone merged the rosters of the Shamrocks with Toronto and discontinued the Shamrocks.

Regular season

Final standings

Schedule and record

See also
 1915–16 NHA season

References

Toronto Blueshirts seasons
Toronto Hockey Club season, 1915-16
Tor